"Lying" is the second single released from Australian band Amy Meredith's debut album, Restless. The single was written by Christian Lo Russo, Joel Chapman and Robert Conley and was produced by Robert Conley and Brian Paturalski.  It was released digitally on 23 April 2010 and physically on 18 June 2010 "Lying" debuted on the ARIA Singles Chart at number 27, before reaching its highest peak to date at number 10 in its fourth week, making it their only top ten single on the charts. It spent five weeks in the ARIA top twenty and 14 weeks in the top 50 and gained platinum accreditation. On other Australian charts, the single has peaked at number 2 on the Australian Singles Chart (chart only for Australian origin), at number 12 on the ARIA Digital Tracks Chart and has reached number 1 on the ARIA Physical Singles Chart.

Charts

Chart positions

Year-end charts

Certifications

Track listings 
CD single 
 "Lying"
 "Pornstar (live)"
Digital 
 "Lying" — 2:59
 "Shock Me" — 3:03

Release history

References 

2010 singles
Amy Meredith songs
Songs written by Robert Conley (music producer)
2010 songs
Sony Music Australia singles